Inia is a genus of river dolphins from South America containing one to four species.

Taxonomy

The genus was described by Alcide d'Orbigny in 1834 when Delphinus geoffrensis, described by Henri Marie Ducrotay de Blainville in 1817, was recognized to be a unique taxon. A 1998 classification listed a single species, Inia geoffrensis, in the genus Inia, with three recognized subspecies. Most of the scientific community accepted this single species classification, as does the IUCN. As of 2016 the Committee on Taxonomy of the Society for Marine Mammalogy considers the genus Inia to contain one species with only two subspecies: the Bolivian (I. g. boliviensis) and the Amazon (I. g. geoffrensis) subspecies. In 2014, the population in the Araguaia-Tocantins basin was proposed to define an additional species, Inia araguaiaensis, but this remains debated. The American Society of Mammalogists recognizes the highest number of species at four, although this is only tentative, pending further studies which could either confirm or deny the classification.

American Society of Mammalogists Classification

Genus Inia

 Species Inia araguaiaensis  – Araguaian river dolphin
 Species Inia boliviensis – Bolivian river dolphin
 Species Inia geoffrensis – Amazon river dolphin
 Species Inia humboldtiana – Orinoco river dolphin

IUCN Classification

Genus Inia
 Species Inia geoffrensis – Amazon river dolphin
 Amazon Subspecies I. g. geoffrensis
 Bolivian Subspecies I. g. boliviensis
 Orinoco Subspecies I. g. humboldtiana
Society For Marine Mammalogy Classification

 Genus Inia
 Species Inia geoffrensis – Amazon river dolphin
 Amazon Subspecies I. g. geoffrensis
 Bolivian Subspecies I. g. boliviensis

References

General references
 
 Juliet Clutton-Brock (2000). Mammals, 381 pages.

River dolphins
Cetacean genera
Mammals of South America
Mammals described in 1834
Taxa named by Alcide d'Orbigny

pl:Inia
sk:Inia